Admiral John Gordon (1792 - 11 November 1869) was a Royal Navy officer and the son of George Gordon, Lord Haddo.

He captained  in 1844–1845. There was an incident in which he left his station despite being ordered to stay, in order to take Mexican merchants' gold to England, after which he was court-martialled for disobeying orders and retired from active service. In 1863, in retirement, he rose to the rank of admiral.

Gordon Head in Saanich, Vancouver Island, Canada, is named after him.

References

1792 births
1869 deaths
 Royal Navy admirals